Doppel, German for "double", may refer to:

Ikarus Doppel, a German two-place, hang glider design
PRND, the prion protein 2 (dublet), also known as PRND, or Doppel protein

See also
Doppelgänger
Doppelganger (disambiguation)